This is the discography of British rock band Barclay James Harvest, including its subsequent incarnations as John Lees' Barclay James Harvest and Barclay James Harvest Featuring Les Holroyd.

Albums

Studio albums

Live albums

Compilation albums

Box sets

Video albums

EPs

Singles

Notes

References

Discographies of British artists
Rock music group discographies